Pavlica is a small settlement southwest of Ilirska Bistrica in the Inner Carniola region of Slovenia.

References

External links
Pavlica on Geopedia

Populated places in the Municipality of Ilirska Bistrica